The 2010 Macau Open Grand Prix Gold was a badminton tournament which took place at the Cotai Arena in the Venetian, Macau on 27 July to 1 August 2010 and had a total purse of $120,000.

Men's singles

Seeds

 Lee Chong Wei (champion)
 Peter Gade (withdrew)
 Sony Dwi Kuncoro (quarterfinals)
 Simon Santoso (semifinals)
 Boonsak Ponsana (semifinals)
 Kenichi Tago (withdrew)
 Wong Choong Hann (third round)
 Hu Yun (third round)
 Muhammad Hafiz Hashim (withdrew)
 Dionysius Hayom Rumbaka (third round)
 Chan Yan Kit (third round)
 Parupalli Kashyap (second round)
 Hsieh Yu-hsing (quarterfinals)
 Tanongsak Saensomboonsuk (third round)
 Son Wan-ho (quarterfinals)
 Kazushi Yamada (third round)

Finals

Women's singles

Seeds

 Lu Lan (withdrew)
 Yao Jie (second round)
 Eriko Hirose (quarterfinals)
 Zhou Mi (semifinals)
 Yip Pui Yin (withdrew)
 Bae Seung-hee (first round)
 Bae Yeon-ju (first round)
 Salakjit Ponsana (first round)

Finals

Men's doubles

Seeds

  Mathias Boe / Carsten Mogensen (withdrew)
  Markis Kido / Hendra Setiawan (semifinals)
  Hendra Aprida Gunawan / Alvent Yulianto (final)
  Jung Jae-sung / Lee Yong-dae (first round)
  Fang Chieh-min / Lee Sheng-mu (second round)
  Choong Tan Fook / Lee Wan Wah (second round)
  Hirokatsu Hashimoto / Noriyasu Hirata (first round)
  Chen Hung-ling / Lin Yu-lang (first round)

Finals

Women's doubles

Seeds

  Miyuki Maeda / Satoko Suetsuna (semifinals)
  Chin Eei Hui / Wong Pei Tty (quarterfinals)
  Cheng Wen-hsing / Chien Yu-chin (champion)
  Mizuki Fujii / Reika Kakiiwa (first round)
  Meiliana Jauhari / Greysia Polii (final)
  Zhang Dan / Zhang Zhibo (semifinals)
  Savitree Amitrapai / Vacharaporn Munkit (second round)
  Lee Kyung-won / Yoo Hyun-young (quarterfinals)

Finals

Mixed doubles

Seeds

  Hendra Aprida Gunawan / Vita Marissa (final)
  Lee Yong-dae / Lee Hyo-jung (first round)
  Songphon Anugritayawon / Kunchala Voravichitchaikul (quarterfinals)
  Ko Sung-hyun / Ha Jung-eun (quarterfinals)
  Joachim Fischer Nielsen / Christinna Pedersen (withdrew)
  Tontowi Ahmad / Liliyana Natsir (champion)
  Shin Baek-cheol / Yoo Hyun-young (second round)
  Sudket Prapakamol / Saralee Thoungthongkam (semifinals)

Finals

References

External links
 Tournament Link

Macau Open Badminton Championships
Macau Open
Macau Open